Pa. Vijay is an Indian actor, poet, writer, director, producer and film lyricist for Tamil cinema. He won the National Film Award for Best Lyrics in India for his song Ovvoru Pookalume in Cheran's Autograph (2004).

Career
Vijay is a native of Jayankondam but grew up in Coimbatore where his Father Balakrishnan was Working with National Raw Factory as Spinning man. His mother Saraswathi was a teacher in Government School Kovai. He met K. Bhagyaraj through his brother, who was a family friend and worked with him in films and his magazine, Bhagya. Vijay made his debut as lyricist in Gnanapazham in 1996 and went on to write many popular songs.

Vijay was originally supposed to make his acting debut with Thaai Kaaviyam however the film was shelved after the launch. He then made his acting debut with Gnabagangal (2009) for which he also wrote the script.

Vijay then acted in Ilaignan (2011), scripted by M. Karunanidhi where he was portrayed as a bonded labour of a ship. Vijay made his debut as producer and director with Strawberry (2015).

Filmography
As lyricist

As actor, writer, director & producer

Television
 2004 Kalki
 2004 Manaivi
 2004 Krishna Cottage
 2005 Selvi
 2006 Arasi
 2006 Lakshmi
 2006 Jaiyam
 2007 Vasantham
 2007 Porantha Veeda Puguntha Veeda
 2007 Manjal Magimai
 2008 Namma Kudumbam
 2008 Rudhra
 2008 Bharathi
 2008 Sivasakthi
 2008 Senthoora Poove
 2009 Chellamay
 2009 Rudhra
 2009 Karunamanjari
 2012 Merku Mambalathil Oru Kaadhal
 2012 Paartha Gnabagam Illayo
 2012 Aaha
 2013 Vani Rani
 2013 Mahabharatham
 2018 Maya
 2018 Lakshmi Stores
 2019 Pandavar Illam
 2019 Magarasi
 2019 Chocolate
 2020 Poove Unakkaga
 2020 Vanathai Pola
 2021 Aruvi
 2021 Kayal

Reality Show

References

External links
 
 

Living people
Tamil-language lyricists
Tamil film poets
Indian male poets
1974 births
Filmfare Awards South winners
Male actors from Tamil Nadu
Tamil film directors
Male actors in Tamil cinema
People from Coimbatore
21st-century Indian male actors
Best Lyrics National Film Award winners